Francisco Palacios (born 25 May 1977) is an American-born Puerto Rican professional boxer who challenged for the WBC cruiserweight title in 2011.

Personal life 

Palacios was born in Bronx, New York but moved to Bayamon, Puerto Rico, at the age of 3. Before he took up boxing, Palacios played college basketball on a scholarship at North Carolina Central University.

Amateur career 
From 2000 to 2004 Palacios fought as an amateur boxer and had 70 matches.

Professional career 

On April 2, 2011 Palacios fought in Bydgoszcz against Krzysztof Włodarczyk. Palacios fought for WBC cruiserweight title, but he lost by split decision after 12-rounded bout. Scorecards were 115-113, 113-116 and 112-118.

In his fight in September 2012, he again lost to Włodarczyk, by unanimous decision.

Professional boxing record

References

External links
 
 Francisco 'The Wizard' Palacios - Boxing Bio by doghouseboxing.com

1977 births
Living people
Cruiserweight boxers
Puerto Rican male boxers